Maxine Burnett Moul (born January 26, 1947) is an American politician who served as the 34th lieutenant governor of Nebraska from 1991 to 1993, the first woman to hold that position in the state.  Moul is a member of the Democratic Party.

Life and politics
Moul was raised in Burt County, Nebraska. She graduated from Oakland High School and received her bachelor's degree in journalism from the University of Nebraska in 1969. She worked as a writer and photographer for the Sioux City Journal in Sioux City from 1969 to 1971. She married Francis Moul in 1972 with whom she purchased the Syracuse Journal-Democrat. The Mouls eventually expanded the newspaper into Maverick Media, a larger newspaper and magazine publishing company.

Moul served as the lieutenant governor of Nebraska from 1991 to 1993, with governor Ben Nelson. She resigned in 1993 to become the director of the Nebraska Department of Economic Development, post she held until 1999. From 2001 to 2003 she served as the president of the Nebraska Community Foundation, a charitable organization providing financial management, strategic development, and training services to Nebraska communities and organizations. In 2009 she was appointed as U.S. Department of Agriculture's Rural Development Director for Nebraska.

See also

List of female lieutenant governors in the United States

References

External links

"Moul for Congress" website.  Archived November 2, 2006, from original.

1947 births
Living people
University of Nebraska–Lincoln alumni
Lieutenant Governors of Nebraska
Nebraska Democrats
United States Department of Agriculture officials
People from Burt County, Nebraska
Women in Nebraska politics